Mleiha, also Mileiha or Malaihah, is a town in the Emirate of Sharjah, the United Arab Emirates (UAE) with a population of 4,768 (2015), located some  south of the inland Sharjah town of Dhaid. It is the location of archaeological remnants dating from the Neolithic to pre-Islamic Arabia and home to the Mleiha Archaeological Centre. Mleiha is a UNESCO World Heritage Site.

References

See also 
List of Ancient Settlements in the UAE

Populated places in the Emirate of Sharjah
Central Region, Sharjah